Now Sheba Sings the Song is a book of poems by Maya Angelou, published in 1987.

References

1987 poetry books
American poetry collections
Books by Maya Angelou
Poetry by Maya Angelou